Saudi Arabia national under-20 football team also known as Saudi Arabia Youth team, represents Saudi Arabia in international football competitions in AFC U-19 Championship and FIFA U-20 World Cup, as well as any other under-20 international football tournaments.

Honours
AFC U-19 Championship
 Winners (3): 1986, 1992, 2018
 Runners-up (2): 1985, 2016

Arab Cup U-20
 Winners (1): 2021
 Runners-up (2): 2011, 2012

Palestine Cup of Nations for Youth
 Winners (1): 1985
 Runners-up (1): 1983

GCC U-19 Championship
 Winners (1): 2016

Competitions record

FIFA U-20 World Cup

*Draws include knockout matches decided on penalty kicks.

AFC U-19 Championship

*Draws include knockout matches decided on penalty kicks.

Arab Cup U-20

*Draws include knockout matches decided on penalty kicks.

Palestine Cup of Nations for Youth

*Draws include knockout matches decided on penalty kicks.

Recent results and fixtures

2021

2022

2023

Players

Current squad
 The following 23 players were called up for the 2023 AFC U-20 Asian Cup. On 2 March 2023, Abbas Al-Hassan replaced Mohammed Al-Marri who withdrew due to injury.
 Match dates: 3 – 9 March 2023

Recent call-ups
The following players have previously been called up to the Saudi Arabia under-23 squad in the last 12 months and remain eligible.

Previous squads

FIFA U-20 World Cup squads
1985 FIFA World Youth Championship
1987 FIFA World Youth Championship
1989 FIFA World Youth Championship
1993 FIFA World Youth Championship
1999 FIFA World Youth Championship
2003 FIFA World Youth Championship
2011 FIFA U-20 World Cup
2017 FIFA U-20 World Cup
2019 FIFA U-20 World Cup

See also
 Saudi Arabia national football team
 Saudi Arabia national under-23 football team
 Saudi Arabia national under-17 football team

References

Asian national under-20 association football teams
Under-20